Queen Jeongsun (Hangul:정순왕후 송씨, Hanja:定順王后 宋氏) (1440 – 7 July 1521), of the Yeosan Song clan, was a posthumous name bestowed to the wife and queen consort of Yi Hong-wi, King Danjong, the 6th Joseon monarch. She was queen consort of Joseon from 1454 until her husband's abdication in 1455, after which she was honoured as Queen Dowager Uideok (의덕왕대비) until her deposition in 1457.

Life

Early life 
Lady Song was born in Jeongeup in 1440 into the Yeosan Song clan to Song Hyeon-su and his wife, Lady Min of the Yeoheung Min clan. When she was young, she followed her father Song Hyeon-su and moved to Hanseong. Lady Song’s character was described as polite and modest.

Through her mother, Queen Jangsun and Queen Gonghye are her first cousins once removed, and is a first cousin thrice removed-in-law to Queen Jeonghyeon; the mother of King Jungjong.

Her paternal aunt, Princess Consort Daebang, was the second wife of Grand Prince Yeongeung who was the 8th son of Queen Soheon and King Sejong. Her aunt was later known to have an affair with a Buddhist monk and former governor of Gunjangsa Temple at the time, Hakjo (학조, 學祖; 1431-1514), real name Kim Yeong-hyeong (김영형,  金永衡) of the (new) Andong Kim clan, after her husband died. She was later executed in 1507 for committing adultery. But through her paternal cousin, Princess Gilan eventually became the great-great-grandmother of Queen Inheon, the wife of Wonjong of Joseon and mother of King Injo of Joseon; the future first cousin seven times removed-in-law of Lady Song.

Marriage 
In 1454, there was a selection (Gantaek) made for the future Queen Consort of Joseon. Lady Song was later sent a letter stating that she was chosen among the girls to become the king's consort.

On 19 February 1454 (January 22; lunar calendar), she married Yi Hong-wi (temple name: Danjong), the 6th Joseon monarch who was one year younger, when she was fifteen. As the king's primary consort, she was appointed as queen consort. Danjong was too young to rule the kingdom, and all political processes were controlled by the Chief State Councillor Hwangbo In and General Kim Jong-seo, who was Left State Councillor. 

As Kim Jong-seo and his faction used the chance to extend the power of court officials against many royal family members, the tension between Kim and Grand Prince Suyang (King Sejong's son and King Danjong's uncle) greatly increased; not only Suyang himself, but his younger brother, Grand Prince Anpyeong, also sought an opportunity to take control of the kingdom.

Abdication and aftermath
In 1455, Suyang forced his powerless king to abdicate, declaring himself seventh king of the Joseon dynasty (temple name: Sejo). As wife of the King Emeritus, the Queen received the title 'queen dowager' (wangdaebi; 왕대비) with honorary name Uideok.

The following year, six officials of the court or sayuksin attempted to restore Hong-wi to power, but their plot was discovered and they were immediately executed. The King Emeritus was later demoted to Prince Nosan (노산군, 魯山君) and exiled to Yeongwol County. His wife also lost her status as queen dowager, was demoted to princess consort rank (titled as Princess Consort Nosan; 노산군부인), and kicked out of the palace. The former queen was also given the title of Lady Nosan (노산부인).

When returning back, her parents' home was already destroyed, so she lived in Choam (초암) near Cheongnyongsa Temple in Sungin-dong outside Dongdaemun and stayed with the ladies-in-waiting.

She had a difficult life from then on, and resorted to helping the palace maids with the dyeing business and other chores her own ladies-in-waiting had to do to survive.

At this time, Lady Song wasn't entitled to be given food rations and a home from the royal family. It was said that the women and palace maids in her neighborhood pitied her and, without getting permission from the government, made an arrangement for Lady Song to use the rations and supplies given to them to her secretly.

Perceiving that Prince Nosan would present a continuing threat to the King's rule, the King then accepted the advice of the court and ordered that Prince Nosan be disposed of. In 1457, he was put to death at his place of exile. Yeongdo-gyo (영도교, 永渡橋) in Cheonggyecheon is said to be the last place where Prince Nosan and his wife, who were going back home, meet and separated.  

During King Yeongjo’s reign, he personally wrote the name ‘Dongmangbong’ (동망봉, 東望峰) and had it engraved on a rock on the site. During the Japanese colonial period, the area near Dongmangbong Peak was used as a quarry, and the rock was broken away. As of 2011, there is a pavilion named Dongmangjeong on the south side of Dongmangbong, near Naksan, Jongno-gu, Seoul. 

After hearing of her husband's death, Lady Song climbed a large rock every morning and evening, wailing toward Yeongwol, praying for the soul of his husband. According to Kim Taek-yeong (김택영, 金澤榮; 1850-1927), a writer and historian of the Joseon Dynasty, said in his Yasa, that Shin Suk-ju had asked and tried to make Lady Song his slave. There have been many objections to this happening, but some don't know if it's true or not. But this later prompted King Sejo to state that Lady Song was to "be a slave, but not allow her to serve as a slave".  

But because she couldn't do anything or much of the matter, Lady Song was sent to live in Jeongeobwon (정업원), a place nearby Changdeok Palace, so that no one could commit it. Jeongeobwon was the official royal convent where concubines or wives of royals who lost their spouse or were deposed of, went out of the palace, and spent the rest of their lives in. But it also served as a place of political exile for disgraced women to live a religious and non-political life. Princess Gyeonghye also served some time here before dying in 1474. In 1771, the 47th year of reign of King Yeongjo, a monument and stele was erected in front of the small room, originally a nun’s room, used by the former queen until her death. Part of the epitaph and writing on the signboard were handwritten by the king.

During King Seongjong’s and King Yeonsangun’s reigns, when Song Geo, the younger brother of the Queen, was unable to advance to a public office position due to his father's sins, Song asked Seongjong to make an exception. In the Annals of the Joseon Dynasty, there are records that Seongjong and Yeonsangun bestowed slaves, rice, and linens to the Song clan several times.

After the death of her sister-in-law, Princess Gyeonghye, the princess’s only son, Jeong Mi-su, became close to the former queen during her time in Jeongeobwon as both went through similar circumstances. So upon her death, Jeong also had his aunt-in-law’s rites performed by his descendants.

Death and posthumous title
The Queen died on 7 July 1521 at the age of 80-81; outliving her husband by 64 years, and living through her uncle-in-law King Sejo's reign to her first cousin thrice removed-in-law King Jungjong's reign. She wasn’t given a proper burial, but she was buried near her husband.

There was an attempt to honor the late king and Queen during Jungjong's reign by Jo Gwang-jo from the Sarim Faction and other court officials, but he rejected the proposal. 

During King Hyeonjong’s reign, scholars Song Si-yeol and Kim Su-hang repeatedly proposed that both the deposed Queen and King's title be restored. Song and Kim argued that King Sejo's murder of King Danjong was swayed by the misleading of his aides, and that his true intention was not to kill King Danjong. 

With that in mind, it wasn't until the 24th year reign of King Sukjong, 241 years after the death of the Prince and 177 years after the death of Lady Song, that on 7 December 1698 (6 November; Lunar Calendar), the demoted Lady Song was given the posthumous name “Queen Jeongsun” and her husband, Prince Nosan, was posthumously restored, receiving the temple name of "Danjong". Both were later enshrined in Yeongnyeongjeon Hall of Jongmyo Shrine.

Her tomb was named Sareung (思陵), and it was built in the sense of admiring (Samo; 사모, 思慕) a devoted wife whose husband was unjustly murdered. The tomb is located in Jingeon-eup, Namyangju, Gyeonggi Province.

There was once a legend that the trees planted behind her tomb grew and bowed toward Jangreung, the tomb of King Danjong. Thinking it was a strong spirit protecting Lady Song, in Shamanism, there is a worshipped god named “Lady Song’s God”.

Family
Parent

 Father − Song Hyeon-su (1417 – 21 October 1457) (송현수, 宋玹壽)
 a) Grandfather − Song Bok-won (1390 – 1454) (송복원, 宋復元)
 b) Great-Grandfather − Song Gye-seong (송계성, 宋繼性) (1369 - 1438)
 c) Great-Great-Grandfather − Song Hui (송희, 宋禧) (1342 - 1425)
 c) Great-Great-Grandmother − Lady Kim of the Uiseong Kim clan (의성 김씨, 義城 金氏)
 b) Great-Grandmother − Lady of the Sangju Kim clan (증 숙부인 상주 김씨, 贈 叔夫人 尙州 金氏)
 a) Grandmother − Lady Kim of the Suncheon Kim clan (증 정부인 순천 김씨, 贈 貞夫人 順天 金氏)
 Uncle − Song Kang-su (송강수, 宋玒壽)
 Uncle − Song Jeong-su (송정수, 宋玎壽)
 Aunt - Lady Park (박씨, 朴氏); daughter of Park In-yeong (박인영, 朴仁榮)
 Cousin − Song Yeong (송영, 宋瑛) (? - 1495)
 Aunt − Princess Consort Daebang (대방부부인 송씨, 帶方府夫人 宋氏) (1434 - 1507); Prince Yeongeung's second wife
 Uncle - Yi Yeom, Grand Prince Yeongeung (영응대군 이염, 永膺大君 李琰) (23 May 1434 - 2 March 1467)
 Cousin − Yi Eok-cheon, Princess Gilan (길안현주 이억천, 吉安縣主 李億千) (1457 - 1519)
 Cousin-in-law - Gu Su-yeong (구수영, 具壽永) (1456 - 1523)
 First cousin - Gu Sung-gyeong (구숭경, 具崇璟)
 First cousin - Gu Hui-gyeong (구희경, 具希璟)
 First cousin - Gu Seung-gyeong (구승경, 具承璟)
 First cousin - Princess Consort Myeoncheon of the Neungseong Gu clan (면천군부인 구씨, 沔川郡夫人 具氏) (1480 - 1556)
 First cousin - Gu Mun-gyeong (구문경, 具文璟) (1492 - ?)
 First cousin - Gu Shin-gyeong (구신경, 具信璟)
 First cousin - Gu Sun-bok (구순복, 具順福), Lady Gu of the Neungseong Gu clan (능성 구씨, 綾城 具氏)
 First cousin - Lady Gu (구씨)
 First cousin - Lady Gu (구씨)
 First cousin - Lady Gu (구씨)
 Mother − Internal Princess Consort Yeoheung of the Yeoheung Min clan (1418 – 1498) (여흥부부인 여흥 민씨, 驪興府大夫人 驪興 閔氏)
 Grandfather − Min So-Saeng (민소생, 閔紹生)
 Grandmother − Lady Gu of the Neungseong Gu clan (증 정부인 능성 구씨, 贈 貞夫人 綾城具氏)

Sibling
 Younger brother − Song Geo (송거, 宋琚) (1449 - 1541)

Husband
 King Danjong of Joseon (9 August 1441 – 7 November 1457) (조선 단종)
 Father-in-law: King Munjong (문종, 文宗) (1414 - 1452)
 Mother-in-law: Queen Hyeondeok of the Andong Gwon clan (현덕왕후 권씨, 顯德王后 權氏) (1418 - 1441)
 Sister-in-law: Princess Gyeonghye (경혜공주, 敬惠公主) (1437 - 1473). Husband: Jeong Jong (정종, 鄭悰) (? - 1461) of the Haeju Jeong clan (해주 정씨, 海州 鄭氏)
 Nephew: Jeong Mi-su (정미수, 鄭眉壽) (1456 - 1512)

In popular culture

Drama 
 Portrayed by Shin Eun-gyeong in the 1990 KBS TV series Dance Toward the Broken Heavens
 Portrayed by Park Rusia in the 1994 KBS TV series Han Myeong-hoe
 Portrayed by Chae Shi-ra in the 1998-2000 KBS TV series The King and the Queen
 Portrayed by Chae Shi-ra and Hahm Eun-jung in the 2011-2012 JTBC TV series Queen Insu

Film 
 Portrayed by Eom Aeng-ran in the 1956 film The Tragedy of King Danjong
 Portrayed by Jeon Gye-hyeon in the 1963 film The Tragedy of King Danjong

References

External links
 Thetalkingcupboard.com − Queen Jeongsun of the Yeosan Song clan

1440 births
1521 deaths
Royal consorts of the Joseon dynasty
Korean queens consort
Yeosan Song clan
People from Jeongeup